The Great Lakes Sport Trainer is an American biplane trainer and aerobatic aircraft. It was  originally produced in large numbers before the company building it went bankrupt in the Great Depression in 1933. Owing to its continuing popularity, however, it was eventually placed back into production in the 1970s and again in 2011 by WACO Classic Aircraft.

Development and design
The Great Lakes Aircraft Corporation of Cleveland, Ohio produced a design for a small two-seat sports/trainer in early 1929, with the first prototype flying in March 1929.  The resulting aircraft, designated 2-T-1 was a single bay biplane of mixed, fabric-covered construction and with a tailskid undercarriage.  Power was by a single  Cirrus III inline engine (as the Detroit Aircraft Corporation, the holding company for Great Lakes, also held the American rights to the Cirrus, so all Sports Trainers were originally sold with Cirrus engines). Initial testing showed that the aircraft was tail heavy, so after the first four aircraft were built, the upper wing was swept back.

In January 2011, WACO Classic Aircraft announced that it will put the Great Lakes Model 2T-1A-1/2 model biplane back into production. The aircraft had not been available since 1980. The aircraft will incorporate several changes including metal wing spars. It will be offered in two models, a touring model, with a Lycoming IO-360-B1F6 engine and a higher-performance sport model, with a Lycoming AEIO-360-B1G6 engine. Work on the new production model was completed in June 2013 and the base price announced as US$245,000.

Operational history
The aircraft proved very successful, with about 250 built before construction ended. It was  highly maneuverable even on the relatively modest power of a Cirrus engine.  A 1929 Great Lakes Model 2T1a held for many years the world record for consecutive outside loops, a total of  131, set by Jim Moss flying the Hunt Special which by the early 1930s had been highly modified and re-powered with a Warner Scarab 165 7 cylinder radial engine.

The Great Lakes continued to be popular well after production ended, and many aircraft adopted more powerful engines, particularly the Jacobs radial engines.  Eventually, in the 1960s, the rights for the Sport Trainer were acquired by Harvey Swack, who offered plans of the aircraft for sale to homebuilders.  In 1972, Swack sold the rights on to Doug Champlin, who set up a reconstituted Great Lakes Aircraft Company to produce a revised version meeting the current airworthiness requirements, powered by modern Lycoming engines and revised materials of construction (including the use of Douglas fir instead of spruce).  The first of the new production aircraft, the Model 2T-1A-1, powered by a 140 hp engine was certified in May 1973, with production starting in October that year.  A more powerful version, the 2T-1A-2 followed in July 1974. In 1978, production was divided between Wichita, Kansas, and Enid, Oklahoma, with the intent on relocation to Florida.

Rights to the Sport Trainer continued to switch hands, resulting in production moving several times.  By 1980, 137 Sport Trainers had been built. Production finally finished in 1985.

Variants

Model 2T-1
Original production. 85 hp (63 kW) American Cirrus III engine. Small tail.  Approximately 40 built. 
Model 2T-1A
Revised version with enlarged tail surfaces and 90 hp (67 kW) American Cirrus Ace engine.  About 200 built.
Model 2T-1A-1
New production (1973 on) version. Powered by 140 hp (104 kW) Lycoming O-320 engine.
Model 2T-1A-2
More powerful version - powered by 180 hp (134 kW) Lycoming IO-360 engine.
Model 2T-1A-E
Homebuilt Experimental Plans-built 
Model 2T-1E
95 hp (71 kW) American Cirrus Ensign engine.  About twelve built.
X
A 2T-1E used for aero-engine testing.
Model 2T-1MS
Menasco Pirate powered two-seat version, one example (registration of NC 304Y) airworthy at Old Rhinebeck Aerodrome is fitted with Goodyear "airwheel" low-pressure main gear tires, and was a favorite aircraft of Cole Palen, the museum's founder.
Model 2T-1R
Homebuilt variant with a  Ranger 6-440-5.
Model 2T-2 Speedster
Racing version of 2T-1-A. Powered by   Cirrus Hi-Drive and straight top wing.  Later rebuilt as Model 2T-1E.

WACO Classic 2T-1A-1/2
New production model starting in 2011. There will be two models, a touring model, with a Lycoming IO-360-B1G6 engine and a higher-performance sport model, with a Lycoming AEIO-360-B1G6 engine

Specifications (Model 2T-1A-2)

See also

References

Notes

Bibliography

 Donald, David (editor). The Encyclopedia of World Aircraft. Aerospace Publishing. 1997. .
 Taylor, J.W.R. Jane's All The World's Aircraft 1976-77. London: Jane's, 1976. .
 Taylor, J.W.R. Jane's All The World's Aircraft 1980-81. London: Jane's, 1980. .

External links

Type Certificate

1920s United States civil trainer aircraft
Single-engined tractor aircraft
Sport Trainer
Aerobatic aircraft
Biplanes
Aircraft first flown in 1929